Dillian Whyte vs. Alexander Povetkin was a heavyweight professional boxing match contested between the defending WBC interim champion Dillian Whyte and former world champion Alexander Povetkin, with Whyte's WBC interim and the inaugural WBC Diamond titles on the line. The event was originally scheduled to take place on 2 May 2020 at the Manchester Arena in Manchester, England, but was rescheduled twice due to the COVID-19 pandemic with the event being finalised for 22 August at the headquarters of Matchroom Boxing in Brentwood, Essex. Prior to the rescheduled fight, Whyte split from long-time coach Mark Tibbs and appointed Xavier Miller in the role. Povetkin defeated Whyte via fifth-round knockout.

Fight card

Broadcasters 
The fight was televised live in the United Kingdom and Ireland on PPV's Sky Sports Box Office, as well as in Russia on Ren TV (FTA) and A1 TV (via Amediateka)

- the coverage is not available in UK, IRL, CAN, and selected countries.

See also 

 Alexander Povetkin vs. Dillian Whyte II

References 

2020 in boxing
2020 in English sport
Boxing in England
Sky Sports
2020 in British sport
International sports competitions hosted by England
Dillian Whyte vs. Alexander Povetkin
Sports events postponed due to the COVID-19 pandemic
Boxing matches